Taranna is a rural locality in the local government area (LGA) of Tasman in the South-east LGA region of Tasmania. The 2016 census recorded a population of 156 for the state suburb of Taranna.
It is a hamlet on the Tasman Peninsula. Local points of interest include its Presbyterian church, immediately adjacent to the Federation Chocolate Factory, and a Tasmanian Devil park, "Unzoo".

History
Taranna was gazetted as a locality in 1967. The name is believed to be an Aboriginal word for “wallaby”.

Norfolk Bay Post Office opened on 1 February 1884 and was renamed "Taranna" in 1887. It closed in 1970.

Taranna was first stop on the Convict tramway to Port Arthur.

Geography
The waters of Norfolk Bay form part of the northern and western boundaries.

Road infrastructure
Route A9 (Arthur Highway) runs through from north to south.

References

Towns in Tasmania
Localities of Tasman Council